is a Japanese original video animation series released in Japan in 1987 by Network Frontier (now Bandai Namco Arts). The series is similar to The Twilight Zone. It was aired in Japan on the anime television network Animax on August 5, 2007.

Story
The first part, has two girls at a beach where one of them finds an old camera. She develops the film and finds that she's in a photo, arm-in-arm with a young man, despite not remembering the picture being taken. She then finds out the camera is a model that has not yet been released.

The second part, follows a detective investigating the mysterious disappearances of airplanes, and his investigation into a father and daughter.

Sources:

Cast

Part 1
Mayumi: Mako Hyōdō
Kiwako: Miina Tominaga
Uemura: Masahiro Anzai
Hirata: Yasuyuki Hirata
Dad: Natsuo Tokuhiro
Mom: Kumiko Takizawa
Teacher: Rokurō Naya

Part 2
Man: Tetsuya Kaji
Young Girl: Mako Hyōdō
Radio Announcer: Shigeru Chiba

Sources:

Staff
Part 1
Director: Tomomi Mochizuki
Original Story, Screenplay: Kazunori Itō
Character Design: Akemi Takada
Animation Director: Masako Gotō
Art Director: Shichirō Kobayashi
Audio Director: Shigeharu Shiba
Music: Kenji Kawai
Production: Ajia-do Animation Works
Part 2
Original Story, Screenplay, Director: Mamoru Oshii
Producer: Shin Unosawa, Makoto Kubo
Character Design: Katsuya Kondō
Animation Director: Shinji Ōtsuka
Art Director: Hiromasa Ogura
Camera Director: Seiichi Morishita
Audio Director: Shigeharu Shiba
Music: Kenji Kawai
Key Animation: Kitarō Kōsaka, Katsuya Kondō, Makiko Futaki, Toshio Kawaguchi, Shinji Ōtsuka, Masaaki Endō
Production: Network Frontier Jigyōbu, Studio Deen

Sources:

References

External links
 Bandai Visual
 Review  The Anime Review
 Twilight Q on IMDb 
 

1987 anime OVAs
Ajia-do Animation Works
Japanese detective films
Films about time travel
Japanese aviation films
Studio Deen